The Route du Rhum is a single person transatlantic race the 2018 race was the 11th edition and had six classes with 123 boats taking part.

Results

Ultime

IMOCA 60

Class 40

Multi 50

Rhum Multi

Rhum Mono

References

External links
 
 Official You Tube Channel
 

Route du Rhum
2018 in sailing
Route du Rhum
Single-handed sailing competitions
Class40 competitions
IMOCA 60 competitions